Frederick W. Danziger (January 12, 1906 – October 18, 1948) was an American football player. Danziger was born in 1906 in Detroit and attended Detroit's Western High School. He played college football as a halfback for Michigan State College (later known as Michigan State University) and was co-captain of the 1928 Michigan State Spartans football team. He also played professional football in the National Football League for the Cleveland Indians during the 1931 season. He later worked as a salesman for a biscuit company. He died in 1948 at age 42.

References

1906 births
1948 deaths
Michigan State Spartans football players
Cleveland Indians (NFL 1931) players
Players of American football from Detroit
Western International High School alumni